The 2019 QBL season was the 34th and last season of competition since its establishment in 1979. A total of 30 teams contested the league (15 men and 15 women teams). The regular season was played between 6 April and 3 August 2019, followed by a post-season involving the top eight of each gender in August 2019. The schedule was announced on 22 February 2019. The Brisbane Capitals won their second men's QBL title, whilst the Southern Districts Spartans successfully defended their women's QBL title. The Gold Coast Rollers reached both grand finals, however were unable to win either.

It was announced on October 30 that the 2019 QBL season was the last QBL season to be played, with the league merging with NBL1 for the 2020 season.

Regular season

Men's regular season

Ladder

Women's regular season

Ladder

Finals Series 
The 2019 Queensland Basketball League Finals were played between 10 and 31 August 2019, consisting of two best-of-three semi-final and final series, where the higher seed hosted the first and third games. The Brisbane Capitals won the men's finals, and the Southern Districts Spartans won the women's finals.

Men's finals

Women's finals

Season statistics leaders

Men's leaders

Women's leaders

Awards

Player of the Week

References

Queensland Basketball League seasons
Aus
2019 in Australian basketball